Donald Harris (27 June 1905 – 11 August 1979) was an Australian rules footballer who played with Richmond and Collingwood in the Victorian Football League (VFL).

Harris, a defender, played in three successive grand finals for Richmond but was never a member of a premiership team. The Burnley recruit was a back pocket in the 1926, 1927 and 1928 VFL Grand Finals.

He spent the last two seasons of his league career at Collingwood. His seven votes in the 1932 Brownlow Medal were bettered by only one teammate, Syd Coventry. The year ended with a preliminary final loss and he then retired for business reasons. He however continued participating in amateur football, as the playing coach of Kew in the Sub-District Football Association.

References

1905 births
Australian rules footballers from Victoria (Australia)
Richmond Football Club players
Collingwood Football Club players
Kew Football Club players
1979 deaths